The 2023 Professional Golf Tour of India, titled as the 2023 Tata Steel Professional Golf Tour of India for sponsorship reasons, is the 16th season of the Professional Golf Tour of India and the fourth in which Official World Golf Ranking points are awarded.

Schedule
The following table lists official events during the 2023 season.

Notes

References

Professional Golf Tour of India
Professional Golf Tour of India
Professional Golf Tour of India